Anna Tunnicliffe Tobias (born October 17, 1982) is an American sailor and CrossFit competitor.  In 2008 she won an Olympic gold medal in the Laser Radial single handed sailing class. In 2009 and 2011, she won the ISAF Sailing World Cup in Laser Radial. She also won the women's world championship of the snipe class in 2010, and placed second in 2008.

She was named ICSA Women’s College Sailor of the Year in 2005, ISAF Rolex World Sailor of the Year in 2009 and 2011, and US Sailing’s Rolex Yachtswoman of the Year every year from 2008 to 2011.

Tunnicliffe also competes at the highest level in CrossFit, most recently winning the 2018 CrossFit Games Masters 35–39, and competing in the individual open division at the CrossFit Games in 2013, 2014, 2015, 2016 and 2017. Her best finish was 9th overall, in 2013.  She has three first-place event finishes at the Games: "The Beach" in 2014, "Sandbag 2015" in 2015, and "Rope Chipper" in 2016.

On August 27, 2016, Anna Tunnicliffe married her longtime CrossFit coach Brad Tobias and changed her name to Anna Tunnicliffe Tobias. She and her husband co-own T2CrossFit in Pittsburgh, Pennsylvania.

Biography
Anna Tunnicliffe was born in Doncaster, England. Her parents owned a yacht when she was a child and introduced her to sailing. Anna moved to Perrysburg, Ohio, in the United States, with her family at the age of 12. She attended Perrysburg High School and joined the North Cape Yacht Club, racing Optimists and other small boats for the next five years. In 1999 she began sailing the Laser Radial. Her first event in this boat was at the Leiter Cup in Detroit, Michigan. Despite her small build she advanced to the Smythe Finals for her area, where she was the only woman sailing. She participated in cross country, swimming, and track at the varsity level. In her senior year she won the district track championships in the 800 meters, setting a new high school record of 2 minutes 17.56 seconds. After choosing sailing over track, she decided to go to the Old Dominion University to study and sail. 

In January 2014, Tunnicliffe announced her retirement from Olympic Sailing after 12 years of competition.  She continues to pursue her professional CrossFit career.

On October 23, 2017, Anna Tobias announced that she would become a team athlete in Crossfit with a team from T2Crossfit, the box she co-owns with her husband. She also qualified to compete in the Masters division (35-39) and went on to win that division at the 2018 CrossFit Games

Awards
Tunnicliffe helped to bring four national championships to ODU, including the Women’s National Championship and three Women’s Single-Handed championships. She competed as an A division skipper for the women’s team and B division skipper for the co-ed team during her junior year, and as an A division skipper for both teams as a senior. In her sophomore through senior years, Tunnicliffe was awarded women’s team all American status; she earned co-ed all American status in her senior year. For every year the Quantum Sailor of the Year award (recognizing the top American college female sailor) was given, Tunnicliffe was a finalist. She was a runner up her junior year, missing 1st by 0.02 points, and won in her senior year. She was one of three finalists for the ICSA sportsmanship trophy.

Tunnicliffe was ranked 1st in the world for the women's singlehanded dinghy, the Laser Radial.

Sailing finishes

CrossFit Games results

References

External links 
 
 
 
 

1982 births
Living people
Sportspeople from Doncaster
English emigrants to the United States
American female sailors (sport)
ICSA Women’s College Sailor of the Year
ISAF World Sailor of the Year (female)
Old Dominion University alumni
Old Dominion Monarchs sailors
Olympic gold medalists for the United States in sailing
Sailors at the 2008 Summer Olympics – Laser Radial
Medalists at the 2008 Summer Olympics
Sailors at the 2012 Summer Olympics – Elliott 6m
Snipe class female world champions
US Sailor of the Year
Extreme Sailing Series sailors
CrossFit athletes
Universiade medalists in sailing
Alinghi sailors
World champions in sailing for the United States
People from Perrysburg, Ohio
Universiade silver medalists for the United States
Medalists at the 2005 Summer Universiade
21st-century American women